Charles Victor Jaclard (18 December 1840 – 14 April 1903) was a French revolutionary socialist, a member of the First International and of the Paris Commune.

Early life
Charles Victor Jaclard came from a humble working-class family, but, as a precocious student, he was given a good education, obtaining degrees in mathematics as well as medicine. However, during his studies, he became involved in the radical republican opposition to Napoléon III. After working as a mathematics teacher, he moved to Paris in 1864 to pursue further studies in pharmacology. He soon fell in with the followers of the veteran revolutionary Louis Auguste Blanqui and joined the Blanquists' secret society. In 1865 he helped organise Blanqui's escape from prison to Belgium. That year, Jaclard attended the International Student Congress in Liège, where he gave a speech expounding atheism, materialism and socialism. The speech led the French Council of Universities to ban him from all French universities.

First International and exile
Jaclard was one of the earliest French Blanquists to join the First International, which had been founded in 1864. Other Blanquists initially remained aloof from the organisation because its French section was dominated by followers of Pierre-Joseph Proudhon, whom they considered insufficiently revolutionary. Jaclard, however, seems to have moved easily among the factions of contemporary revolutionary socialism. While he remained involved in the Blanquist organisation, he was on friendly terms with Proudhonist Internationalists like Benoît Malon. In 1866, Jaclard was imprisoned for six months for participating in a demonstration. After his release, he was one of Six Blanquists from Paris who appeared at the 1st General Congress of the International Workingmen's Association held in Geneva, Switzerland from September 3 to 8, 1866. They tried to denounce the French representatives as emissaries of Napoleon III, but were thrown out as unaccredited. 
In 1868, Jaclard was one of the founding members of the International Alliance of Socialist Democracy in Geneva, an organisation created by the Russian anarchist Mikhail Bakunin. It was affiliated with the International Workingmen's Association (the First International), but Bakunin's International Alliance soon came into conflict with the London leadership of the International Association, dominated by Karl Marx. Jaclard's involvement with the Bakuninist Alliance once again demonstrated his ability to transcend factional disputes; in general, the Blanquists were wary of anarchism.

The Paris Commune
Jaclard remained in exile in Geneva until the fall of Napoléon III in 1870. He returned to France to take part in the revolution and in the defence of France against the Germans, who were winning the Franco-Prussian War. In early September 1870, Victor Jaclard seems to have been involved in the uprising of the Lyons Commune, which proclaimed the Republic even before Paris did. Bakunin arrived in Lyons on September 16. Jaclard went on to Paris, charged with establishing a liaison between the Commune of Lyons and the Paris Commune. Sometime earlier, he had met the Russian feminist and revolutionary socialist Anna Vasilevna Korvin-Kurkovskaya (1843–1887) who, after leaving Russia in 1869 "chaperoned" by her newly married sister Sofia Kovalevskaya and her husband Vladimir Kovalevsky had clandestinely gone to Paris. Victor and Anna remained in Paris for the duration of the Franco-Prussian war, and played an active part in the Commune. They contributed to several revolutionary journals and acted as representatives of the First International (Victor was among the representatives of the French section, Anna represented the Russian section). Victor Jaclard was elected commander of the 158th battalion of the National Guard and took part in the insurrection of October 31. In November he became deputy mayor of the 18th district (arrondissement); the mayor was the republican Georges Clemenceau. In February 1871, Jaclard ran unsuccessfully as a Socialist-Revolutionary candidate in the elections to the National Assembly. During the 'Bloody Week' Jaclard fought on the barricades at Batignolles and Château d'eau. With the fall of the Paris Commune, Jaclard was captured and imprisoned by Thiers' forces, and condemned to death.  Anna managed however to escape the country,  to London, where she stayed for a time at the home of Karl Marx.

Anna's parents were alerted to the crisis, probably by her sister Sofia and her husband Vladimir Kovalevsky. The father of Anna and Sofia, retired artillery General Vasily Vasilievich Korvin-Krukovsky, came to Paris from Switzerland, and sent a plea for clemency to Thiers though a mutual acquaintance. Thiers replied that he could not liberate the condemned prisoner, but gave some information as to the subsequent whereabouts of the prisoners, who were to be moved through the streets of Paris at a specific time. With this knowledge, on October 1, someone (possibly Vladimir Kovalevsky) rescued him from the armed guard and helped spirit him out of the country, to Switzerland, where he was joined by Anna and her parents, and where, they finally officially married.

Second exile

Jaclard's recent entanglements with Bakunin apparently did not stand in the way of friendly relations with Marx. In 1874, the Jaclards moved back to Anna's native Russia, where Victor became a teacher of French at a gymnasium for young women. Through Anna he was introduced to Russian Narodnik circles. He contributed to the Russian oppositional journals Slovo and Delo. The couple also maintained friendly relations with Anna's former suitor, Dostoevsky. This demonstrated broad-mindedness on both sides; not only could Anna's past relationship with Dostoevsky have made things awkward, but Dostoevsky was also, by this time, deeply religious and politically conservative. The Jaclards meanwhile were professed atheists, materialists and communists, or, in the Russian terminology of the time, 'nihilists'.

Return to France
In 1880, a general amnesty of Communards enabled the Jaclards returned to France. Jaclard resumed his association with the Blanquists but, characteristically, also remained on good terms with several other political factions. He seems to have been involved in founding the Marxist French Workers' Party of Jules Guesde and Paul Lafargue while simultaneously maintaining good relations with Clemenceau. While republicans like Clemenceau were shedding whatever socialist sympathies they may once have had and moving into positions of power in the Third Republic, the French Blanquists and Marxists firmly opposed socialist participation in 'bourgeois' republican governments and furiously denounced reformist socialists like Alexandre Millerand who sought power. Jaclard was once again able to straddle that divide.

In the 1880s, Jaclard edited the journal La Justice. This was Clemenceau's paper. In 1889 he was elected to the city council of Alfortville, where he had settled after Anna's death in 1887. Apparently, Jaclard's capacity for broad sympathy with all sorts of radical causes led him to sympathize with General Georges Boulanger's campaign for a revision of the constitution in the late 1880s. Many French socialists and republicans suspected Boulanger of monarchist designs, but the General professed himself a sincere republican and social reformer. Jaclard was not the only veteran Blanquist to sympathize with Boulangism; in fact the Blanquist Central Revolutionary Committee had split over it, with Ernest Granger leading the Boulangist minority on a long march to the far right, while Édouard Vaillant led the anti-Boulangists into an alliance with Marxism. Jaclard, meanwhile, apparently remained on good terms with all concerned.

The Second International
The First International had expired in the 1870s, due to the factional conflict between Marxists and Bakuninists. The anarchists had kept their own International going for some time, but the socialist International was practically defunct. In the late 1880s, efforts were made to revive it, which led eventually to the creation of the Second International in 1889. Jaclard was actively involved in these endeavours. He was a French delegate to the International congresses of 1889, 1891 and 1893, held in Paris, Brussels and Zurich, respectively. Jaclard was also a member of the Union of Socialist Journalists, serving as its (1843- general secretary. He was also the author of the pamphlet Tactiques Socialistes (1893). Although Jaclard had not spent much of his time practising medicine, he seems to have remained a doctor in good standing in the eyes of his profession. At any rate, the British Medical Journal of May 2, 1903, noted his recent death. What is striking about Jaclard is his political adaptability and the ease with which he maintained good personal as well as political relations with representatives of very different, and in some cases mutually hostile, ideological tendencies: Blanquism, Proudhonism, Bakuninism, Marxism, Clemenceauvian Radicalism and Boulangism.

Sources and Links
 http://chipluvrio.free.fr/yin-yang-terre/terrep2/terre2-vf-2.html
 http://www.leksikon.org/art.php?n=4573
 Wolfe, R., 'The Parisian Club de la Revolution of the 18th Arrondissement 1870-1871.' Past & Present. No. 39, April 1968.
 Doty, S., 'Parliamentary Boulangism After 1889.' In: The Historian, Vol. 32, Issue 2, February 1970.
 Frank, J., Dostoevsky: The Mantle of the Prophet, 1871-1881. Princeton, 2002, pp. 362 ff.
 Lantz, K.A., 'Korvin-Krukovskaia, Anna Vailevna (1843–1887).' In: The Dostoevsky Encyclopedia. pp. 219–221.

Notes

Members of the International Workingmen's Association
French socialists
1840 births
1903 deaths
Communards